Jesper Pedersen (born 23 January 1961) is a Danish footballer manager and former player who manages FA 2000.

References 
 Ny træner klar i Holbæk
 "Købmand" med succes møder Svebølle
 Trænerteam er endeligt på plads

1961 births
Living people
Danish men's footballers
Association football midfielders
Herfølge Boldklub players
Næstved Boldklub players
Danish football managers
Herfølge Boldklub managers
Boldklubben af 1893 managers
Holbæk B&I managers
Køge Nord FC managers
FA 2000 managers